Cyclorrhapha is an unranked taxon within the infraorder Muscomorpha. They are called "Cyclorrhapha" ('circular-seamed flies') with reference to the circular aperture through which the adult escapes the puparium. This is a circumscriptional name that has significant historical familiarity, but in the present classification, this name is synonymous with the more recent "Muscomorpha".

Cyclorrhapha underwent major adaptive radiation that led to the creation of over 72 000 species. These species share multiple attributes such as the 360-degree rotation of the male terminalia.

References

Muscomorpha
Protostome unranked clades